Kunštát may refer to the following places in Czech Republic:

Kunštát, a town in the South Moravian Region
Kunštát Castle
Kunštát, a village in Orlické Záhoří municipality